Adonis K. Alexander (born November 7, 1996) is an American football cornerback for the New Orleans Breakers of the United States Football League (USFL). He played college football at Virginia Tech, and was drafted by the Washington Redskins in the sixth round of the 2018 NFL supplemental draft.

Early years and college career
Alexander attended Independence High School in the city. He then attended Virginia Tech, and was ruled academically ineligible for his final year, preventing him from entering the 2018 NFL Draft. However, he entered in to the 2018 NFL supplemental draft.

Professional career

Washington Redskins
Alexander was drafted by the Washington Redskins in the sixth round of the 2018 supplemental draft.

Alexander was waived on August 31, 2019, but was signed to the practice squad the following day. He was released on October 1, 2019.

Los Angeles Rams
On November 14, 2019, Alexander was signed to the Los Angeles Rams practice squad. He signed a reserve/future contract with the Rams on December 31, 2019.

Alexander was waived on September 4, 2020.

San Francisco 49ers
On January 4, 2021, Alexander signed a reserve/future contract with the San Francisco 49ers. Alexander was waived on May 4, 2021.

New Orleans Saints
On August 4, 2021, Alexander signed with the New Orleans Saints. He was waived/injured and placed on injured reserve on August 18, 2021. He was waived on August 21.

New Orleans Breakers
Alexander was selected in the 8th round of the 2022 USFL Draft by the New Orleans Breakers. He was transferred to the inactive roster on April 22, 2022. He was transferred to the active roster on April 30.

References

External links 

 
 Virginia Tech bio
 Washington Redskins bio

1996 births
Living people
Players of American football from Charlotte, North Carolina
American football cornerbacks
Virginia Tech Hokies football players
Washington Redskins players
Los Angeles Rams players
San Francisco 49ers players
New Orleans Saints players
New Orleans Breakers (2022) players